Seán O'Sullivan (20 June 1906 – 3 May 1964) was an Irish painter. He was educated at Synge Street CBS in Dublin and went on to study drawing at the Dublin Metropolitan School of Art where he won a scholarship and studied lithography at the Central School of Arts and Crafts in London. He also studied painting in Paris at Colarossi's and La Grande Chaumiere.

He began exhibiting at the Royal Hibernian Academy (RHA) in 1926, at the age of 20, contributing an average of six paintings a year until his death. Primarily a portrait painter, O'Sullivan composed works featuring many of the leading political and cultural figures in Ireland, including Éamon de Valera, Douglas Hyde, W B Yeats, and James Joyce. He designed the cover for the Capuchin Annual in 1930. His work was also part of the painting event in the art competition at the 1932 Summer Olympics.

 Between 1943 and 1957 O'Sullivan designed commemorative stamps for the Irish Post Office of Douglas Hyde, based on his own portrait of him, William Rowan Hamilton, Edmund Rice and Admiral William Brown.

References

External links 
 O'Sullivans painting, Seanchaí of Ros Muc
 O'Sullivan at Visual Arts Cork
 Biography of Seán O'Sullivan 
 Seán O'Sullivan's profile at Sports Reference.com

1906 births
1964 deaths
20th-century Irish painters
Irish male painters
Painters from Dublin (city)
Olympic competitors in art competitions
Irish stamp designers
Alumni of the National College of Art and Design
People educated at Synge Street CBS
20th-century Irish male artists